Beintehaa (: Endless Love)  is an Indian  television series that premiered on 30 December 2013 on Colors TV. It starred Preetika Rao and Harshad Arora in lead roles.

Plot
Charming, flamboyant Zain, and pretty, cultured Aaliya have been rival cousins since childhood. They eventually grow up and meet again, but a series of misunderstandings lead them to marry each other. Zain wants to get rid of his "Maammu Ki Bhanji" aka Aaliya as he calls her, as soon as possible. He does not believe in the institution of marriage. His brother, Fahad has two wives, Nafisa and Shazia who hate each other.

Fahad's mom Suraiya wanted a grandson; Nafisa was unable to conceive anymore after having two girls. So, Fahad married Shazia and they had a son. He loves both his wives. Zain Aaliya constantly bickers, but slowly with time, "KitKit and MKB" finally become friends. Zain is injured in an accident. The accident was caused by Rocky, a brothel owner who tries to deceive Aaliya's sister Aayat, but Zain saves her and puts Rocky behind the bars. This accident however brings Zain and Aaliya closer to each other.

Suraiya emotionally blackmails Aaliya, making her leave. But Zain brings her back. Fahad and his father Usman plan to make Zain and Aaliya fall in love. Suraiya dislikes Aaliya and her family because Barkat, her long-lost daughter was kidnapped by Aaliya's estranged uncle, Mir Khan. Zain and Aaliya finally find Barkat. Joyous, Suraiya starts liking Aaliya and her family again, which makes Shazia and Nafisa unhappy.

Zain and Aaliya finally realize their love for each other. Zain feels jealous whenever he sees Aaliya and Zubair together (they are cousins, actually). On the other hand, Nafisa's brother, Rizwan has fallen for Aayat too. Out of angst, Zain unintentionally hurts Aaliya's feelings, who leaves for her hometown Bhopal and leaves a message asking him to realize his mistake. Zain reaches Bhopal and after escaping a tragedy, Zain-Aaliya finally confesses their love for each other and returns home happily.

Aaliya soon finds Barkat's behavior suspicious, and it is revealed she is actually Mir's biological daughter who is after the Abdullahs' family wealth and property. Zain and Aaliya expose Barkat, who is thrown out of the house, but before going, she poisons Suraiya's mind against Aaliya, telling her she is having an affair with Zubair. Thus Suraiya again starts hating Aaliya.

She plots to separate Zain and Aaliya by creating misunderstandings between them. Due to a major misunderstanding created by Nafisa, Zain begins hating Aaliya, unknowingly. Usman meets with an accident and become paralyzed and Aaliya is held responsible for that as she was the one who sent him to the office.

Aaliya gets help from lawyer Rehan, a single father of two children, and a family friend of the Abdullah's. He tries to get to the bottom of the truth regarding the arrest and finds out it was Nafisa. He plots a plan to make her think Usman is alive, which frightens her and causes her to expose herself before him.

Aaliya is still hurt by Zain's mistrust in her and decides to start afresh somewhere else. Having realized her wrongdoings, Nafisa apologizes and tells Aaliya to not reveal for the sake of her daughters. Aaliya forgives and tells her she's moving away. Rehan sends Nafisa's recording to Zain, who realizes his mistake and rushes to stop Aaliya but it is too late. He breaks down but vows to find her and win her back.

1 year later 

Aaliya lives in Hyderabad and is a proud owner of "Bawarchi Dhaba". On the other hand, Zain is completely broken and devastated. He is seen always going to Usman's grave and repenting his mistake. He still searches for Aaliya every day. Nafisa has repented and still seeks forgiveness from Zain, who began hating her after her betrayal for a year. She wishes Zain-Aaliya to find their way back to each other.

On a visit to Hyderabad, as fate would have it, Zain finds Aaliya and gets emotional but she is still cold towards him. Heartbroken, Zain attempts to win her back and eventually succeeds. Zain and Aaliya decide to remarry in a mosque, but the Qazi finds out about their divorce and tells Aaliya that she has to do 'Halala Nikah' to remarry Zain.

With no other option left, Aaliya decides to marry Bilal, Zain's cousin, in order to remarry Zain. Bilal gets kidnapped and Aaliya eventually marries Rehan. Zain finds out Rehan is plotting against Suraiya as he thinks she killed his first wife. Suraiya finds out the truth about Aaliya's innocence from Nafisa. It is revealed Suraiya didn't kill Rehan's wife, who indeed committed suicide. Zain saves Rehan's daughter from an accident. Rehan apologizes.

Zain-Aaliya finally gets married. Suriya and Fahad are still cold towards Nafisa but Aaliya tells them to forgive her. Zain's doppelganger, Rocket is brought into the house as Zain by Suraiya's evil sister, Zarina. Later, the truth comes out, and the real Zain appears as he was kidnapped. Again, he and Aaliya are reunited. Regretful, Zarina apologizes.

Nafisa is pregnant again. The whole family is happy except Shazia, who plots to harm her. But Nafisa saves Shazia's son, Saif who is nearly hurt. Shazia also realizes her mistake and accepts she tried to kill the baby, but everyone makes her realize she and Nafisa can't compete with each other, and Fahad treats both wives equally and loves them both.

7 years later 

Zain and Aaliya have a son, Zayed Zain Abdullah. Rizwan and Aayat too have a daughter, Kashish. They both bicker, which reminds Zain-Aaliya of their childhood "Tom and Jerry" fights. Suraiya and the Abdullahs appear to hold Usman's frame and remember him on his death anniversary. Finally, they all live happily together.

Cast

Main
Preetika Rao as Aaliya Abdullah (nee: Haider): Shabana and Ghulam's daughter; Osman's maternal niece; Fahad and Zain's cousin, later Zain's wife; Rehan's former wife; Zayed's mother (Female Protagonist)
Harshad Arora in double role as
 Zain Abdullah: Surraiya and Osman's son; Shabana's fraternal nephew; Aaliya and Aayat's cousin, later Aaliya's husband; Zayed's father (Male Protagonist)
 Rocket Fernandez: Zain's doppelganger (Antagonist)

Recurring
Suchitra Pillai as Surraiya Abdullah: Zarina's sister; Osman's wife; Fahad and Zain's mother; Zayed, Aroob, Sana and Saif's paternal grandmother
Naved Aslam as Osman Abdullah: Shabana's brother; Surraiya's husband; Aaliya and Aayat's maternal uncle; Fahad and Zain's father; Zayed, Aroob, Sana and Saif's paternal grandfather (deceased)
Vivek Madan as Fahad Abdullah: Surraiya and Osman's son; Shabana's fraternal nephew; Aaliya and Aayat's cousin; Nafisa and Shazia's husband, Aroob, Sana and Saif's father; Zayed's paternal uncle
Gunjan Vijaya as Nafisa Abdullah: Rizwan's sister; Fahad's first wife; Aroob and Sana's mother; Zayed's paternal aunt
Namrata Pathak as Shazia Abdullah: Fahad's second wife; Saif's mother; Zayed's paternal aunt
Rituraj Singh as Ghulam Haider: Shabana's husband; Mir's brother; Fahad and Zain's fraternal uncle; Aaliya and Aayat's father; Zayed and Kashish's maternal grandfather
Riva Bubber as Shabana Haider: Osman's sister; Fahad and Zain's fraternal aunt; Ghulam's wife; Aaliya and Aayat's mother; Zayed and Kashish's maternal grandmother
Vikas Grover as Rizwan Malik: Nafisa's brother; Zain's friend; Aayat's husband; Kashish's father; Zayed's sororal uncle
Shivangi Joshi as Aayat Malik (nee:Haider) : Shabana and Ghulam's daughter; Osman's maternal niece; Fahad and Zain's cousin;  Aaliya's sister; Rizwan's wife; Kashish's mother; Zayed's sororal aunt
Nandish Sandhu as Rehan Khan: Habeeb's son; Rida and Aaliya's former husband; Zara and Kabir's Father
Astha Agarwal as Rida Khan: Rehan's first wife (deceased)
Raju Kher as Dr. Habeeb Khan: Rehan's father
Imran Khan as Rahim Qureshi: Zarina's husband; Fahad and Zain's sororal uncle; Bilal's father
Kamya Panjabi as Zarina Qureshi: Surraiya's sister; Fahad and Zain's sororal aunt; Rahim's wife; Bilal's mother
Neel Motwani as Bilal Qureshi: Zarina and Rahim's son; Surraiya's sororal nephew; Fahad and Zain's cousin
Dimple Jhangiani as Barkat Abdullah/Bobby Khan: Mir's daughter; Fake Barkat
Ankush Bali as Rafeeq Qureshi
Mohit Sinha as Sarju (Aaliya's Dhaba Employee)
Mohit Malhotra as Zubair Qureshi: Aaliya and Aayat's cousin
Sunil Sinha as Mir Khan: Ghulam's brother; Bobby's father
Wasim Faras as Zeeshan Ahmed: Zoya's son; Aaliya's ex-fiancé
Vaishali Jhulka as Asmita Ahmed
Farook Qaasi as Mohsin Ahmed
Gaurav Devaiyya as Omar Ahmed
Priya Shinde as Sanam: Zain's ex-fiancée
Vishesh Bansal as Zayed Abdullah: Aaliya and Zain's son
Sheela Sharma as Zoya Ahmed
Madhuri Sanjeev as Chan bibi  
Puru Chibber as Rocky Singh

Guest Appearance
Akshay Kumar (Eid Special to promote his film It's Entertainment with Tamannaah Bhatia)
 Toral Rasputra as Anandi (Balika Vadhu)
Sanaya Irani as Parvati (Rangrasiya Crossover episode)
Ashish Sharma as Rudra (Rangrasiya Crossover episode)
Drashti Dhami as Madhu (Madhubala Ek Ishq Ek Junoon)
Tina Datta as Meethi (Uttaran)
Rashami Desai from (Uttaran)
Siddharth Shukla as Shiv (Balika Vadhu)
Mrunal Jain as Akash (Uttaran)
Dipika Kakar as Simar (Sasural Simar Ka)
Avika Gor as Roli (Sasural Simar Ka)
Tejasswi Prakash as Dhara (Sanskaar - Dharohar Apnon Ki)

Awards & Nominations

Reception 
Beintehaa stood at a steady 3.0 TVM figure for consecutive weeks. The show went off-air after successfully completing 11 months on 21st November 2014.

Beintehaa was again reaired as "Pyaar Ka Fitoor" from 21 October 2021 and was broadcast on Colors Rishtey, just a month before its 7-year completion anniversary.

Crossover episodes
On 31 May 2014, Beintehaa had a crossover with the TV show Rangrasiya.

References

External links 
 

Hindi-language television shows
Indian television soap operas
Colors TV original programming
Television shows set in Uttar Pradesh
Indian drama television series
2014 Indian television series debuts
2015 Indian television series endings